Ronisa Lipi Fiaalii (born 27 August 1995) is a Samoan footballer who has represented both Samoa and New Zealand internationally. She plays as a goalkeeper.

Lipi was born in American Samoa and grew up in Lufilufi, Samoa. She moved to New Zealand at the age of 13, where she was educated at Wellington East Girls' College. She played for Waterside Karori, and for Wellington East school. Since 2018 she has played for Wellington United.

In 2012 she was selected for the young football ferns for the 2012 OFC Women's Under 17 Qualifying Tournament and 2012 FIFA U-17 Women's World Cup. In 2014 she was named to the New Zealand women's national under-20 football team for the 2014 FIFA U-20 Women's World Cup.

In November 2018 she was selected for the Samoa women's national football team for the 2018 OFC Women's Nations Cup. In June 2019 she was named to the squad for the 2019 Pacific Games. In July 2022 she was named to the squad for the 2022 OFC Women's Nations Cup.

References

External links

Living people
1995 births
People from Atua (district)
New Zealand sportspeople of Samoan descent
New Zealand women's association footballers
Samoan women's footballers
Samoa women's international footballers
Women's association footballers not categorized by position